Mârouf, savetier du Caire (Marouf, Cobbler of Cairo) is an opéra comique by the French composer Henri Rabaud. The libretto, by Lucien Nepoty, is based on a tale from the Arabian Nights. Mârouf was first performed at the Opéra-Comique, Paris, on 15 May 1914. The premiere was a great success and Mârouf became Rabaud's most popular opera. The score makes great use of oriental colour. The United States premiere of the opera was given at the Metropolitan Opera on December 19, 1917, with Giuseppe De Luca in the title role, Frances Alda as Princess Saamcheddine, and Pierre Monteux conducting. The Viennese premiere was at the Vienna State Opera on 24 January 1929, with Josef Kalenberg and Margit Angerer ("who received the most applause"), and Franz Schalk conducting.

The opera was revived at the Opéra-Comique in 2013 in a production by Jérôme Deschamps, with Jean-Sébastien Bou in the title role, conducted by Alain Altinoglu.

Roles

Synopsis
The hen-pecked cobbler Mârouf decides to join a group of sailors and travels to Khaïtân where he pretends to be a rich merchant awaiting the arrival of his caravan. The sultan is impressed and offers him the hand of his daughter Saamcheddine. Mârouf's deception is discovered and he flees, followed by the princess, who has fallen in love with him. They find a mysterious ring which gives Mârouf power over a magician. The magician grants Mârouf's wish for the caravan he boasted about to become reality. The sultan is appeased, pardons Mârouf and allows him to marry Saamcheddine.

References

Sources
The Viking Opera Guide, ed. Holden (Viking, 1993)
Del Teatro (in Italian)

French-language operas
Opéras comiques
Operas by Henri Rabaud
1914 operas
Operas
Opera world premieres at the Opéra-Comique
Music based on One Thousand and One Nights
Fiction about shoemakers